Memphis World was an African-American newspaper founded in Memphis, Tennessee, in 1931. It was edited by Lewis O. Swingler, and published by W. A. Scott and L. F. Scott. Educator and activist Estes Kefauver had a column in the paper. The World closed in 1973.

The paper advocated for civil rights.

References

Defunct newspapers published in Tennessee
Newspapers published in Memphis, Tennessee
1931 establishments in Tennessee
1973 disestablishments in Tennessee
Publications disestablished in 1973
Publications established in 1931